The JFK Medical Center is a 486-bed medical center in Atlantis, Florida. It has over 500 affiliated physicians, 2200 healthcare professionals, and 300 volunteers. The hospital specializes in cardiovascular care. It is a teaching hospital affiliated with the University of Miami's Leonard M. Miller School of Medicine.

The former West Palm Beach Hospital became JFK North Medical Center. It specializes in psychiatric and orthopedic care.

History 
The hospital was founded in 1966 as a community hospital and was named for former U.S. president John F. Kennedy.

The hospital is home to ACGME accredited residencies in internal medicine and general surgery.

References

Sources 
JFK Medical Center at U.S. News & World Report's "Best Hospitals".

Hospital buildings completed in 1976
HCA Healthcare
Hospitals in Florida
1966 establishments in Florida
Buildings and structures in Palm Beach County, Florida
Psychiatric hospitals in Florida
West Palm Beach, Florida